Pangi may refer to:

Geography

Democratic Republic of the Congo
 Pangi, Democratic Republic of the Congo, a community in Maniema province
 Pangi Territory, a territory in Maniema province, Democratic Republico of the Congo

India
 Pangi Valley, a municipality of Himachal Pradesh
 Panaji, a city in Goa 

Iran
 Pangi, Iran, a village in Razavi Khorasan Province, Iran
 Pangi, East Azerbaijan, a village in East Azerbaijan Province, Iran

Malaysia
 Tenom Pangi Dam, a hydroelectric plant in Tenom, Sabah, Malaysia

Vanuatu
 Panngi, a large village in south-western Pentecost Island, Vanuatu

Other uses
 Pangi (Maroon), the name used by the Maroon people of Suriname for a type of cloth, and also for a wrap that may be made from this cloth
 Pangium, a tree species with poisonous fruit